Zaunbrecher is a surname. Notable people with the surname include:

Ed Zaunbrecher (born 1950), American football coach
Godfrey Zaunbrecher (born 1946), American football player